Themba Ndaba (born 14 February 1965) is a South African actor and director. He is best known for casting in the movie Machine Gun Preacher and in the series Zone 14. He currently stars as Brutus Khoza in the South African Ferguson Films TV series The Queen.

Biography 
Born in Soweto, Gauteng, he moved to Swaziland (since 2018 renamed to Eswatini) at an early age and was brought up there. He started school in 1970 and matriculated at St Marks High School in 1982. He then went to study Economics and Statistics in Zimbabwe in 1983. He took a break from studies and worked as a banker in Harare for a while. From 1986 to 1988 he attended Harare Polytechnic, where he graduated with a Higher National Diploma in Business Studies with a distinction in Economics and Statistics.

Filmography 
Machine Gun Preacher
Hopeville
The Queen
Zone 14
The Road
Mfolozi Street
Gomora
Rockville
Rhythm City
Redemption

Awards 
In 2011, He won a Golden Horn Award for being the Best Feature in a movie and also won the 2011 Africa Movie Academy Awards for his leading role in the movie Hopeville.

Television 
He plays a role as Brutus Khoza in the Ferguson Films TV series The Queen.

Personal life 
In 1998, he married actress Sophie Ndaba, whom he has two children with; they divorced in 2007. In 2011, he married Josey Ndaba, with whom he has one child.

References

External links 
Themba Ndaba on IMDB

South African male film actors
Living people
1965 births
South African male television actors